Goes, de Goes and van der Goes are surnames. They may refer to:

 Albrecht Goes (1908–2000), German writer and Protestant theologian
 Jelle Goes (born 1970), Dutch football manager
 Joaquim Goes, Indian oceanographer
 Luís Goes (1933–2012), Portuguese musician
 Milroy Goes (born 1986), Indian film director
 Peter Goes (born 1968), Belgian author and illustrator
 Sandry Roberto Santos Goes (born 2002), Brazilian footballer
 Wouter Goes (born 2004), Dutch footballer
 Bento de Goes (1562–1607), Portuguese missionary and explorer
Eric Batista de Goes (born 1984), Brazilian footballer
Rodrygo Silva de Goes (born 2001), Brazilian footballer
Adriaen van der Goes (–1560), Dutch grand pensionary
Freddie van der Goes (1908–1976), South African swimmer
Hugo van der Goes (–1482), Flemish painter
 Louis Napoleon van der Goes van Dirxland (1806–1885), Dutch politician
 Marinus van der Goes van Naters (1900–2005), Dutch nobleman and politician
 Philips van der Goes (1651–1707), Dutch naval officer
 Wouter van der Goes (born 1973), Dutch radio disc jockey

See also
Vinícius Goes Barbosa de Souza (born 1991), Brazilian footballer
Gois (disambiguation)
Góes

Goes, van der 
Goes